The Regard d'or is the Grand Prize of the Fribourg International Film Festival

Award Winners

Distribution’s help Award: 1986-1994 
 1986 : Wend Kuuni (God's Gift) by Gaston Kaboré  Burkina Faso
 1988 : The Horse Thief (Dao Ma Tse) by Tian Zhuangzhuang  China
 1988 : La Lumière (Yeelen) by Souleymane Cissé Mali
 1990 : Piravi by Shaji N. Karun India
 1992 : Ganh Xiec Rong by Việt Linh Vietnam
 1993 : The Night (Al Leil) by Mohammad Malas Syria
 1993 : Xuese Qingchen by Li Shaohong China
 1994 : Kosh ba kosh by Bakhtiar Khudojnazarov Tajikistan
 1994 : The Puppetmaster (Ximeng Rensheng) by Hou Hsiao-hsien Taiwan

Grand Prize: 1995-1997 
 1995 : Madagascar by Fernando Pérez Cuba
 1995 : Quiereme y veras by Daniel Díaz Torres Cuba 
 1996 : Don't Die Without Telling Me Where You're Going (No te mueras sin decirme adónde vas) by Eliseo Subiela Argentina
 1997 : Nuages de pluie sur Wushan: l'attente by Ming Zhang China

Grand Prix "Le Regard d'or": 1998-today 
 1998 : Pizza, Beer, and Cigarettes by Adrián Caetano Argentina
 1998 : Who the Hell Is Juliette? by Carlos Marcovich Mexico
 1999 : La Vie Sur Terre by Abderrahmane Sissako Mauritania
 2000 : The Bird Who Stops in the Air (Saeneun pyegoksuneul keruinda) by Jeon Soo-il South Korea
 2001 : Et un et deux (Yi yi) by Edward Yang Taiwan
 2002 : Camel(s) by Park Ki-Yong South Korea
 2003 : Intimate Stories (Historias mínimas) by Carlos Sorín Argentina
 2004 : Días de Santiago (Days of Santiago) de Josué Méndez Peru
 2005 : Night of Truth (La Nuit de la vérité) by Fanta Régina Nacro Burkina Faso France
 2006 : Gradually (Be Ahestegui) by Maziar Miri Iran
 2007 : A Casa de Alice by Chico Teixera Brazil
 2008 : Flower in the Pocket by Liew Seng Tat Malaysia
 2009 : My Magic by Eric Khoo Singapore
 2010 : The Other Bank (Gagma napiri) by George Ovashvili Georgia
 2011 : Poetry by Lee Chang-dong South Korea
 2012 : Never Too Late (Af Paam Lo Meuchar) by Ido Fluck Israel
 2013 : Three Sisters (San Zimei) by Wang Bing France China
 2014 : Han Gong-ju by Lee Su-jin South Korea
 2015 : González by Christian Díaz Pardo Chili 
 2016 : Mountain by Yaelle Kayam Israel
 2017 : Apprentice by Boo Junfeng Singapore, Hong Kong, Qatar, Germany, France
 2018 : Black Level by Valentyn Vasyanovych Ukraine
 2019 : The Good Girls by Alejandra Márquez Abella Mexico
 2020 : You Will Die at Twenty by Amjad Abu Alala Sudan
 2021 : Night of the Kings by Philippe Lacôte Côte d'Ivoire, France, Canada, Senegal

References

Swiss film awards
International film awards